The iBest Award (Prêmio iBest, in Portuguese), formerly called Internet World BEST, is an award previously provided by Brasil Telecom (formerly provided by Grupo Mantel, and later by Grupo GP) for websites in Brazil, now provided by iBest Global. The awards were given to websites chosen by either a popular or an official jury. The official jury compromises the people responsible for the award. The popular jury is compromised by internauts, who may vote and even recommend a website. Nowadays, only the popular jury and the academy may vote.

Categories 
There are currently 54 categories for the iBest award, separated in eleven different groups.

Afnities 
 Kids 
 Women 
 Personalities 
 Religion and Esotericism 
Blogs 
News 
Humor 
Technology 
Varieties 
Sports 
Celebrities 
Politics 
Citizenship 
Social actions and NGOs 
Education and Training 
Government 
Services to the citizen
Politics 
Electronic Commerce
E-Commerce 
Communication
Media & Communication
Podcast 
Finances / Insurance
Banks & Finances 
Insurance
Industry 
Drink & Food
Electro-Electronics 
Computer-related 
Vehicles 
Leisure 
Arts & Culture 
Cinema 
Entertainment 
Sports 
Soccer 
Games 
Music 
Radio 
Health 
Television 
Tourism 
Sport fishing 
Videos 
Comedy
Documentary 
Sports 
Short subjects
Animation

Sites that earned iBest Award 
 Gr@tis (19 times awarded 1st place in several categories) http://www.gratis.com.br 
 Charges.com.br
 UOL

References 

 Sobre o Prêmio iBest 
 Blog do Prêmio iBest

External links 
  
 Prêmio iBest volta a internet após 12 anos e com curadoria digital 
 Prêmio iBest é relançado 12 anos após sua última edição  
 Prêmio iBest é Relaçando  

Internet in Brazil
Brazilian awards
Awards established in 1995
1995 establishments in Brazil